The Robertians (sometimes called the Robertines in modern scholarship) are the proposed Frankish family which was ancestral to the Capetian dynasty, and thus to the royal families of France and of many other countries.  The Capetians appear first in the records as powerful nobles serving under the Carolingian dynasty of Charlemagne in West Francia, which later became France. As their power increased, they came into conflict with the older royal family and attained the crown several times before the eventual start of the continuous rule of the descendants of Hugh Capet (ruled 987–996).

Hugh's paternal ancestral family, the Robertians, appear in documents that can trace them back to his great-grandfather Robert the Strong (d. 866). His origins remain unclear, but medieval records hint at an origin in East Francia, in present-day Germany, an area then still also ruled by the Carolingians. In particular, Regino of Prüm (died 915 CE) states that Robert the Strong's son Odo was said to be a relative (nepos) of a Count Meingaud, count of an area near Worms, who died in 892, and there are indications that Maingaud's family used the names Robert and Odo.

Modern proposals about their ancestry further back are based on the idea that there was one family which frequently named its sons Robert, including Robert III of Worms (800–834), Robert the Strong (d. 866), and Robert I of France (866–923). For example, one proposed ancestor is Robert of Hesbaye (c. 800), about whom there are almost no records.

The Robertian family figured prominently amongst the Carolingian nobility and married into this royal family. Eventually, the Robertians themselves produced Frankish kings such as the brothers Odo (reigned 888–898) and Robert I (r. 922–923), then Hugh Capet (r. 987–996), who ruled from his seat in Paris as the first Capetian king of France.

Although Philip II Augustus (r. 1180–1223) was officially the last monarch of France with the title "King of the Franks" (rex Francorum) and the first to style himself "King of France" (roi de France), in (systematic application of) historiography, Hugh Capet holds this distinction. He founded the Capetians, the royal dynasty that ruled France until the revolution of the Second French Republic in 1848save during the interregnum of the French Revolution and Napoleonic Wars. Members of the family still reign in Europe today; both King Felipe VI of Spain and Grand Duke Henri of Luxembourg descend from this family through the Bourbon cadet branch of the dynasty.

Origin

The oldest known Robertians probably originated in the county of Hesbaye, around Tongeren in modern-day Belgium. The first certain ancestor is Robert the Strong count of Paris, probably the son of Robert III of Worms, grandson of Robert of Hesbaye, and nephew of Ermengarde of Hesbaye, who was the daughter of Ingram, and wife of Louis the Pious. Other related family includes Cancor, founder of the Lorsch Abbey, his sister Landrada and her son Saint Chrodogang, archbishop of Metz.

History

Robert the Strong
The sons of Robert the Strong were Odo and Robert, who were both king of Western Francia and ruled during the Carolingian era. His daughter Richildis married a count of Troyes. The family became Counts of Paris under Odo and "Dukes of the Franks" under Robert, possessing large parts of the ancient Neustria.  Although quarrels continued between Robert's son Hugh the Great and Louis IV of France, they were mended upon the ascension of Lothair I of France (954–986).  Lothair greatly expanded the Robertian dominions when he granted Hugh Aquitaine as well as much of Burgundy, both rich and influential territories, arguably two of the richest in France.

The Carolingian dynasty ceased to rule France upon the death of Louis V (d. 987).  After the death of Louis, the son of Hugh the Great, Hugh Capet was chosen as king of the Franks, nominally the last ruler of West Francia. Given the resurgence of the Holy Roman Empire title and dignities in the West Francian kingdom, Europe was later believed to have entered a new age, so Hugh came to be known in historiography as the first king of France, as western civilization was perceived to have entered the High Middle Ages period. Hugh was crowned at Noyon on July 3, 987 with the full support of Holy Roman Emperor Otto III. With Hugh's coronation, a new era began for France, and his descendants came to be named, after him, the Capetians. They ruled France as the Capetians, Valois, and Bourbons until the French Revolution. They returned after 1815 and ruled until Louis Philippe was deposed in 1848.

However, they have continued to rule Spain, with two republican interruptions, through the Bourbon Dynasty right down to the current king Felipe VI.

Family branches

The first two generations are speculative.
Robert I, Count of Hesbaye (697-748), Count of Hesbaye and Duke of Neustria, married Williswinda of Worms
Cancor (d. 771), founder of Lorsch Abbey
Heimrich (d. 795), count in the Lahngau
Poppo of Grapfeld (d. 839–41), ancestor of the Frankish House of Babenberg
Landrada, married Sigramnus, Count of Hesbaye
Saint Chrodogang (d. 766), Archbishop of Metz, Abbot of Lorsch Abbey
Sigram of Hesbaye
Ingerman, Count of Hesbaye (750-818)
Ermengarde of Hesbaye (778-818), wife of Emperor Louis the Pious
Thuringbert, Count of Hesbaye (735-770)
Robert II, Count of Hesbaye (770–807)
Robert III of Worms (800–834)
Robert the Strong (830–866)
Odo of Paris (857-898), king of West Francia from 888, married Théodrate of Troyes
Raoul
Arnulf
Guy
Richildis, or Regilindis, married to William I of Périgueux, son of Count Wulgrin I of Angoulême
Robert (866–923), king of West Francia from 922, second marriage to Béatrice of Vermandois
Emma (894–935), married Rudolph of Burgundy
Adela, married Herbert II, Count of Vermandois
Hugh the Great (898–956), married for the 3rd time to Hedwige of Saxony, daughter of German king Henry the Fowler
Béatrice (c.938–987), married Frederick of Bar
Hugh Capet (c.939–996), ancestor of the Capetian dynasty
Emma of Paris, Duchess of Normandy (c.943–968), married Richard I, Duke of Normandy
Otto of Paris (c.944–965), Duke of Burgundy from 956
Odo-Henry (c.946–1002), Duke of Burgundy from 965
Herbert (d. 996), Bishop of Auxerre

References

Sources
Pierre Riché. The Carolingians, a Family who Forged Europe. University of Pennsylvania Press.
Christian Settipani and Patrick van Kerrebrouck. La Préhistoire des Capetiens, Première Partie: Mérovingiens, Carolingiens et Robertiens.